The Chaos Pool is a Big Finish Productions audio drama based on the long-running British science fiction television series Doctor Who.

Plot
Chaos and Order, old friends and old enemies and beginning and end of time come head to head at the conclusion of the search for The Key to Time.

Cast
The Doctor – Peter Davison
Amy – Ciara Janson
Zara – Laura Doddington
Astra of Atrios / Romana – Lalla Ward
The Black Guardian – David Troughton
The White Guardian – Jason Watkins (uncredited)
Captain Pargrave – Ben Jones
Commander Hectocot – Toby Longworth
The Voice – Cate Hamer

External links
Big Finish – The Chaos Pool
The Chaos Pool Episode One review at Den of Geek
The Chaos Pool Episode Two review at Den of Geek

2009 audio plays
Fifth Doctor audio plays